Black Jesus is an American sitcom created by Aaron McGruder (creator of The Boondocks) and Mike Clattenburg that aired on Adult Swim. The series stars Gerald "Slink" Johnson, Charlie Murphy, Corey Holcomb, Kali Hawk, King Bach, Andra Fuller, and John Witherspoon. The series premiered on August 7, 2014. On December 10, 2014, the series was renewed for a second season, which premiered on September 18, 2015. Its third and final season premiered on September 21, 2019.

Premise 
The scripted live-action comedy features Jesus Christ living in modern-day Compton, California, on a mission to spread love and kindness throughout the neighborhood with his small group of followers.

Series overview

Cast 
 Gerald "Slink" Johnson as Jesus Christ
 Charlie Murphy as Victor "Vic" Hargrove (seasons 1–2)
 John Witherspoon as Lloyd Hamilton
 Kali Hawk as Maggie (seasons 1–2)
 Corey Holcomb as Boonie
 Andra Fuller as Fish (seasons 1–2)
 Andrew Bachelor as Trayvon (seasons 1–2)
 Angela E. Gibbs as Ms. Tudi
 Antwon Tanner as Jason (main seasons 1–2; recurring season 3)
 Valenzia Algarin as Dianne (main seasons 1–2; recurring season 3)
 Dominique as Shalinka (recurring seasons 1–2; regular season 3)
 Jamar Malachi Neighbors as Ambro

International broadcast 
The series premiered in Australia on June 8, 2015, on The Comedy Channel, and in Canada on April 1, 2019, on Adult Swim.

Reception 
At Metacritic, which assigns a normalized rating out of 100 to reviews from critics, the first season received an average score of 73, which indicates "generally positive reviews", based on five reviews. Brian Lowry of Variety gave the series a positive review, saying "Black Jesus is funny in part because it ventures so eagerly into areas most producers and networks, worn down by years of calls for sponsor boycotts and bad publicity, have simply decided it’s easier to avoid." Robert Lloyd of the Los Angeles Times gave the series a positive review, saying "I'm not saying it's particularly deep, and it is filled with language that cannot be reproduced in this newspaper, but it's good-natured and, compared with a lot of what's on television, the comedy is gentle and hopeful." Soraya Nadia McDonald of The Washington Post said, "Like his earthly counterparts, Black Jesus doesn’t have a perfect track record, but he gets the big concepts and leads by example. If anything, it seems McGruder is trying to tell his audience that if Jesus is just like us, maybe it’s not so much of a stretch for us to be just like him." James Poniewozik of Time stated, "You might expect McGruder, given his Boondocks history, to be out for pointed religious satire, but Black Jesus is really more of a stoner hangout comedy with a heart."As the series shows "Jesus" using several curse words, smoking marijuana, and drinking alcoholic beverages, several pastors called for its removal from the air .

References

Notes

External links 
 

2014 American television series debuts
2019 American television series endings
2010s American black sitcoms
Adult Swim original programming
Portrayals of Jesus on television
Television series by Williams Street
Television shows set in Compton, California